Charles Goddard  (1770–1848) was an Anglican priest, the Archdeacon of Lincoln from 1817 to 1844.

He was born at Marylebone 11 December 1769. He matriculated at Christ Church, Oxford in 1787, graduating M.A. by decree in March 1821, and B.D. and D.D. the same year. He held incumbencies at St James Garlickhythe and St Denys, Ibstock. He died on 21 January 1848.

References

Clergy of the Church of England Database

1770 births
1848 deaths
Alumni of Christ Church, Oxford
Archdeacons of Lincoln